"Zindagi Ek Safar Hai" (translation: Life is a journey) is a song from the Hindi film Andaz, composed by the duo of Shankar Jaikishan, written by Hasrat Jaipuri and sung by Kishore Kumar. The song topped the annual list of Binaca Geetmala for 1971.

Picturization
In the film, Rajesh Khanna features in the Happy Version of the song sung by Kishore Kumar. The second version sung by Mohammad Rafi features Shammi Kapoor, Hema Malini and Rajesh Khanna

Awards
 19th Filmfare Awards
 Best Lyricist: Hasrat Jaipuri: Won
 Best Male Singer: Kishore Kumar: Nominated

Trivia
 There are four versions of this song. The other two versions were sung by Asha Bhosle & Mohammad Rafi. Other version is Malaysian/Indonesian parody created by GedengKartun Channel.
 This song also features in 2002 movie Mujhse Dosti Karoge! in the song "The Medley" where Sonu Nigam lends his voice.

See also
 Binaca Geetmala annual list 1971

References

External links
 List of Filmfare Award Winners and Nominations, 1953-2005

Hindi film songs
Indian songs
Number-one singles in India
Kishore Kumar songs
1971 songs
Films scored by Shankar–Jaikishan
Asha Bhosle songs
Mohammed Rafi songs
Songs with lyrics by Hasrat Jaipuri